Sick of It All: The Story So Far is a 2001 American documentary film about the punk band Sick of It All. It was directed by Brant Sersen.

Cast 
 Dicky Barrett
 Gary "Chops" MacConnie
 CIV (band)
 H2O (band)
 John Joseph
 Lou Koller – Sick of It All – vocals
 Pete Koller – Sick of It All – guitars
 Armand Majidi – Sick of It All – drums
 NOFX (band)
 Rancid (band)
 Craig Setari – Sick of It All – bass

References

External links 
 
 

2001 films
Documentary films about punk music and musicians
2000s English-language films